Markovo is the name of several  rural localities in Russia.

Amur Oblast
As of 2010, one rural locality in Amur Oblast bears this name:
Markovo, Amur Oblast, a selo in Markovsky Rural Settlement of Blagoveshchensky District

Chelyabinsk Oblast
As of 2010, one rural locality in Chelyabinsk Oblast bears this name:
Markovo, Chelyabinsk Oblast, a village in Khutorsky Selsoviet of Uvelsky District

Chukotka Autonomous Okrug
As of 2010, one rural locality in Chukotka Autonomous Okrug bears this name:
Markovo, Chukotka Autonomous Okrug, a selo in Anadyrsky District

Irkutsk Oblast
As of 2010, one rural locality in Irkutsk Oblast bears this name:
Markovo, Irkutsk Oblast, a selo in Ust-Kutsky District

Ivanovo Oblast
As of 2010, four rural localities in Ivanovo Oblast bear this name:
Markovo, Gavrilovo-Posadsky District, Ivanovo Oblast, a village in Gavrilovo-Posadsky District
Markovo, Komsomolsky District, Ivanovo Oblast, a selo in Komsomolsky District
Markovo, Shuysky District, Ivanovo Oblast, a village in Shuysky District
Markovo, Verkhnelandekhovsky District, Ivanovo Oblast, a village in Verkhnelandekhovsky District

Kaluga Oblast
As of 2010, two rural localities in Kaluga Oblast bear this name:
Markovo, Baryatinsky District, Kaluga Oblast, a village in Baryatinsky District
Markovo, Spas-Demensky District, Kaluga Oblast, a village in Spas-Demensky District

Kirov Oblast
As of 2010, two rural localities in Kirov Oblast bear this name:
Markovo, Nemsky District, Kirov Oblast, a selo in Markovsky Rural Okrug of Nemsky District
Markovo, Yaransky District, Kirov Oblast, a village in Opytnopolsky Rural Okrug of Yaransky District

Kostroma Oblast
As of 2010, six rural localities in Kostroma Oblast bear this name:
Markovo, Chukhlomsky District, Kostroma Oblast, a village in Sudayskoye Settlement of Chukhlomsky District
Markovo, Galichsky District, Kostroma Oblast, a village in Dmitriyevskoye Settlement of Galichsky District
Markovo, Ostrovsky District, Kostroma Oblast, a village in Adishchevskoye Settlement of Ostrovsky District
Markovo, Soligalichsky District, Kostroma Oblast, a village in Burdukovskoye Settlement of Soligalichsky District
Markovo, Belkovskoye Settlement, Vokhomsky District, Kostroma Oblast, a village in Belkovskoye Settlement of Vokhomsky District
Markovo, Petretsovskoye Settlement, Vokhomsky District, Kostroma Oblast, a village in Petretsovskoye Settlement of Vokhomsky District

Kurgan Oblast
As of 2010, two rural localities in Kurgan Oblast bear this name:
Markovo, Markovsky Selsoviet, Ketovsky District, Kurgan Oblast, a selo in Markovsky Selsoviet of Ketovsky District
Markovo, Svetlopolyansky Selsoviet, Ketovsky District, Kurgan Oblast, a station in Svetlopolyansky Selsoviet of Ketovsky District

Kursk Oblast
As of 2010, one rural locality in Kursk Oblast bears this name:
Markovo, Kursk Oblast, a selo in Markovsky Selsoviet of Glushkovsky District

Leningrad Oblast
As of 2010, two rural localities in Leningrad Oblast bear this name:
Markovo, Tikhvinsky District, Leningrad Oblast, a village in Tsvylevskoye Settlement Municipal Formation of Tikhvinsky District
Markovo, Volosovsky District, Leningrad Oblast, a village in Begunitskoye Settlement Municipal Formation of Volosovsky District

Lipetsk Oblast
As of 2010, one rural locality in Lipetsk Oblast bears this name:
Markovo, Lipetsk Oblast, a village in Domovinsky Selsoviet of Izmalkovsky District

Mari El Republic
As of 2010, one rural locality in the Mari El Republic bears this name:
Markovo, Mari El Republic, a village in Markovsky Rural Okrug of Orshansky District

Moscow Oblast
As of 2010, five rural localities in Moscow Oblast bear this name:
Markovo, Osheykinskoye Rural Settlement, Lotoshinsky District, Moscow Oblast, a village in Osheykinskoye Rural Settlement of Lotoshinsky District
Markovo, Lotoshino, Lotoshinsky District, Moscow Oblast, a village under the administrative jurisdiction of the work settlement of Lotoshino, Lotoshinsky District
Markovo, Ozyorsky District, Moscow Oblast, a village in Boyarkinskoye Rural Settlement of Ozyorsky District
Markovo, Ramensky District, Moscow Oblast, a selo in Kuznetsovskoye Rural Settlement of Ramensky District
Markovo, Ruzsky District, Moscow Oblast, a village in Kolyubakinskoye Rural Settlement of Ruzsky District

Nizhny Novgorod Oblast
As of 2010, six rural localities in Nizhny Novgorod Oblast bear this name:
Markovo, Bor, Nizhny Novgorod Oblast, a village in Redkinsky Selsoviet of the city of oblast significance of Bor
Markovo, Semyonov, Nizhny Novgorod Oblast, a village in Ivanovsky Selsoviet of the city of oblast significance of Semyonov
Markovo, Gorodetsky District, Nizhny Novgorod Oblast, a village in Zinyakovsky Selsoviet of Gorodetsky District
Markovo, Koverninsky District, Nizhny Novgorod Oblast, a village in Bolshemostovsky Selsoviet of Koverninsky District
Markovo, Tonshayevsky District, Nizhny Novgorod Oblast, a village in Oshminsky Selsoviet of Tonshayevsky District
Markovo, Voskresensky District, Nizhny Novgorod Oblast, a village in Nestiarsky Selsoviet of Voskresensky District

Novgorod Oblast
As of 2010, six rural localities in Novgorod Oblast bear this name:
Markovo, Borovichsky District, Novgorod Oblast, a village in Zhelezkovskoye Settlement of Borovichsky District
Markovo, Demyansky District, Novgorod Oblast, a village in Ilyinogorskoye Settlement of Demyansky District
Markovo, Novgorodsky District, Novgorod Oblast, a village in Novoselitskoye Settlement of Novgorodsky District
Markovo, Poddorsky District, Novgorod Oblast, a village in Belebelkovskoye Settlement of Poddorsky District
Markovo, Starorussky District, Novgorod Oblast, a village in Velikoselskoye Settlement of Starorussky District
Markovo, Valdaysky District, Novgorod Oblast, a village in Yedrovskoye Settlement of Valdaysky District

Novosibirsk Oblast
As of 2010, one rural locality in Novosibirsk Oblast bears this name:
Markovo, Novosibirsk Oblast, a village in Kuybyshevsky District

Perm Krai
As of 2010, two rural localities in Perm Krai bear this name:
Markovo, Chaykovsky, Perm Krai, a village under the administrative jurisdiction of the city of krai significance of Chaykovsky
Markovo, Beryozovsky District, Perm Krai, a village in Beryozovsky District

Primorsky Krai
As of 2010, one rural locality in Primorsky Krai bears this name:
Markovo, Primorsky Krai, a selo under the administrative jurisdiction of the city under krai jurisdiction of Lesozavodsk

Pskov Oblast
As of 2010, twelve rural localities in Pskov Oblast bear this name:
Markovo, Dedovichsky District, Pskov Oblast, a village in Dedovichsky District
Markovo, Loknyansky District, Pskov Oblast, a village in Loknyansky District
Markovo, Novorzhevsky District, Pskov Oblast, a village in Novorzhevsky District
Markovo, Novosokolnichesky District, Pskov Oblast, a village in Novosokolnichesky District
Markovo, Opochetsky District, Pskov Oblast, a village in Opochetsky District
Markovo (Berezhanskaya Rural Settlement), Ostrovsky District, Pskov Oblast, a village in Ostrovsky District; municipally, a part of Berezhanskaya Rural Settlement of that district
Markovo (Berezhanskaya Rural Settlement), Ostrovsky District, Pskov Oblast, a village in Ostrovsky District; municipally, a part of Berezhanskaya Rural Settlement of that district
Markovo (Gorodishchenskaya Rural Settlement), Ostrovsky District, Pskov Oblast, a village in Ostrovsky District; municipally, a part of Gorodishchenskaya Rural Settlement of that district
Markovo, Palkinsky District, Pskov Oblast, a village in Palkinsky District
Markovo, Pechorsky District, Pskov Oblast, a village in Pechorsky District
Markovo, Pustoshkinsky District, Pskov Oblast, a village in Pustoshkinsky District
Markovo, Velikoluksky District, Pskov Oblast, a village in Velikoluksky District

Ryazan Oblast
As of 2010, one rural locality in Ryazan Oblast bears this name:
Markovo, Ryazan Oblast, a village in Markovsky Rural Okrug of Rybnovsky District

Samara Oblast
As of 2010, one rural locality in Samara Oblast bears this name:
Markovo, Samara Oblast, a selo in Kinel-Cherkassky District

Smolensk Oblast
As of 2010, five rural localities in Smolensk Oblast bear this name:
Markovo, Dorogobuzhsky District, Smolensk Oblast, a village in Usvyatskoye Rural Settlement of Dorogobuzhsky District
Markovo, Dukhovshchinsky District, Smolensk Oblast, a village in Bulgakovskoye Rural Settlement of Dukhovshchinsky District
Markovo, Krasninsky District, Smolensk Oblast, a village in Neykovskoye Rural Settlement of Krasninsky District
Markovo, Kapustinskoye Rural Settlement, Novoduginsky District, Smolensk Oblast, a village in Kapustinskoye Rural Settlement of Novoduginsky District
Markovo, Vysokovskoye Rural Settlement, Novoduginsky District, Smolensk Oblast, a village in Vysokovskoye Rural Settlement of Novoduginsky District

Tver Oblast
As of 2010, eleven rural localities in Tver Oblast bear this name:
Markovo, Bezhetsky District, Tver Oblast, a village in Bezhetsky District
Markovo, Kalininsky District, Tver Oblast, a village in Kalininsky District
Markovo, Kalyazinsky District, Tver Oblast, a village in Kalyazinsky District
Markovo (Shepelevskoye Rural Settlement), Kashinsky District, Tver Oblast, a village in Kashinsky District; municipally, a part of Shepelevskoye Rural Settlement of that district
Markovo (Davydovskoye Rural Settlement), Kashinsky District, Tver Oblast, a village in Kashinsky District; municipally, a part of Davydovskoye Rural Settlement of that district
Markovo, Kimrsky District, Tver Oblast, a village in Kimrsky District
Markovo (Stanskoye Rural Settlement), Likhoslavlsky District, Tver Oblast, a village in Likhoslavlsky District; municipally, a part of Stanskoye Rural Settlement of that district
Markovo (Veskinskoye Rural Settlement), Likhoslavlsky District, Tver Oblast, a village in Likhoslavlsky District; municipally, a part of Veskinskoye Rural Settlement of that district
Markovo, Molokovsky District, Tver Oblast, a village in Molokovsky District
Markovo, Sonkovsky District, Tver Oblast, a village in Sonkovsky District
Markovo, Zubtsovsky District, Tver Oblast, a village in Zubtsovsky District

Tyumen Oblast
As of 2010, one rural locality in Tyumen Oblast bears this name:
Markovo, Tyumen Oblast, a selo in Zavodoukovsky District

Udmurt Republic
As of 2010, two rural localities in the Udmurt Republic bear this name:
Markovo, Debyossky District, Udmurt Republic, a village in Uyvaysky Selsoviet of Debyossky District
Markovo, Syumsinsky District, Udmurt Republic, a village in Vaskinsky Selsoviet of Syumsinsky District

Vladimir Oblast
As of 2010, four rural localities in Vladimir Oblast bear this name:
Markovo, Kolchuginsky District, Vladimir Oblast, a village in Kolchuginsky District
Markovo (village), Petushinsky District, Vladimir Oblast, a village in Petushinsky District
Markovo (selo), Petushinsky District, Vladimir Oblast, a selo in Petushinsky District
Markovo, Yuryev-Polsky District, Vladimir Oblast, a village in Yuryev-Polsky District

Vologda Oblast
As of 2010, ten rural localities in Vologda Oblast bear this name:
Markovo, Babayevsky District, Vologda Oblast, a village in Kuysky natsionalny vepssky Selsoviet of Babayevsky District
Markovo, Bechevinsky Selsoviet, Belozersky District, Vologda Oblast, a village in Bechevinsky Selsoviet of Belozersky District
Markovo, Kunostsky Selsoviet, Belozersky District, Vologda Oblast, a village in Kunostsky Selsoviet of Belozersky District
Markovo, Mezhdurechensky District, Vologda Oblast, a village in Botanovsky Selsoviet of Mezhdurechensky District
Markovo, Nikolsky District, Vologda Oblast, a village in Niginsky Selsoviet of Nikolsky District
Markovo, Syamzhensky District, Vologda Oblast, a village in Rezhsky Selsoviet of Syamzhensky District
Markovo, Vashkinsky District, Vologda Oblast, a village in Andreyevsky Selsoviet of Vashkinsky District
Markovo, Leskovsky Selsoviet, Vologodsky District, Vologda Oblast, a village in Leskovsky Selsoviet of Vologodsky District
Markovo, Markovsky Selsoviet, Vologodsky District, Vologda Oblast, a village in Markovsky Selsoviet of Vologodsky District
Markovo, Vytegorsky District, Vologda Oblast, a village in Devyatinsky Selsoviet of Vytegorsky District

Yaroslavl Oblast
As of 2010, ten rural localities in Yaroslavl Oblast bear this name:
Markovo, Chudinovsky Rural Okrug, Bolsheselsky District, Yaroslavl Oblast, a village in Chudinovsky Rural Okrug of Bolsheselsky District
Markovo, Markovsky Rural Okrug, Bolsheselsky District, Yaroslavl Oblast, a village in Markovsky Rural Okrug of Bolsheselsky District
Markovo, Borisoglebsky District, Yaroslavl Oblast, a selo in Ramensky Rural Okrug of Borisoglebsky District
Markovo, Babayevsky Rural Okrug, Danilovsky District, Yaroslavl Oblast, a village in Babayevsky Rural Okrug of Danilovsky District
Markovo, Semivragovsky Rural Okrug, Danilovsky District, Yaroslavl Oblast, a village in Semivragovsky Rural Okrug of Danilovsky District
Markovo, Semlovsky Rural Okrug, Danilovsky District, Yaroslavl Oblast, a village in Semlovsky Rural Okrug of Danilovsky District
Markovo, Trofimovsky Rural Okrug, Danilovsky District, Yaroslavl Oblast, a village in Trofimovsky Rural Okrug of Danilovsky District
Markovo, Nekouzsky District, Yaroslavl Oblast, a village in Rozhalovsky Rural Okrug of Nekouzsky District
Markovo, Rostovsky District, Yaroslavl Oblast, a selo in Savinsky Rural Okrug of Rostovsky District
Markovo, Tutayevsky District, Yaroslavl Oblast, a village in Rodionovsky Rural Okrug of Tutayevsky District